The Austria women's national under-20 basketball team is a national basketball team of Austria, administered by the Austrian Basketball Federation. It represents the country in women's international under-20 basketball competitions.

FIBA U20 Women's European Championship participations

See also
Austria women's national basketball team
Austria women's national under-18 basketball team
Austria men's national under-20 basketball team

References

External links
Archived records of Austria team participations

B
Women's national under-20 basketball teams